= Jaipur Shopping Festival =

Jaipur Shopping Festival is an annual shopping festival conducted each year in the month of September and October in Jaipur, India.
